Summer Wishes, Winter Dreams is a 1973 American Technicolor drama film directed by Gilbert Cates and written by Stewart Stern, starring Joanne Woodward, Martin Balsam, and Sylvia Sidney. It tells the story of a New York City housewife who rethinks her relationships with her husband, her children, and her mother.

Summer Wishes, Winter Dreams garnered Academy Award nominations for Best Actress in a Leading Role (Woodward) and Best Actress in a Supporting Role (Sidney).

Plot
Rita Walden is a depressed, middle-aged New Yorker. Always tired, Rita is prone to nightmares, and when she does dream more pleasant thoughts, they are of her childhood on the family farm. In her mind, she settled for second best when she married her ophthalmologist husband, Harry, as she still thinks about what life would have been like with the older farm boy on whom she had a crush at age 12½. She is constantly bickering with her mother, her sister Betty, and her grown-up daughter Anna, who has issues of her own. Rita is estranged from her son Bobby; she is in denial about his homosexual orientation. After Rita's mother dies suddenly, Rita is on the verge of a nervous breakdown in dealing with her mother's estate, especially when the family talks about selling her beloved farm, which she still intends to pass on to Bobby. Harry thinks that a European vacation would help Rita clear her mind, with the possibility of visiting Bobby, who is currently living in Amsterdam. Although Rita faces some crises on the trip, many of her conflicts do ease after she sees Harry revisit Bastogne for the first time since his days in World War II.

Cast
 Joanne Woodward as Rita Walden
 Martin Balsam as Harry Walden
 Sylvia Sidney as Mrs. Pritchett
 Tresa Hughes as Betty Goody
 Dori Brenner as Anna
 Ron Rickards as Bobby Walden
 Win Forman as Fred Goody
 Peter Marklin as Joel
 Nancy Andrews as Mrs. Hungerford
 Minerva Pious as woman in theatre
 Sol Frieder as man in theatre
 Helen Ludlam as grandmother
 Grant Code as grandfather
 Gaetano Lisi as student in theatre
 Lee Jackson as Carl

See also
 List of American films of 1973

External links
 
 
 
 

1973 films
1973 drama films
1973 LGBT-related films
1970s American films
1970s English-language films
American drama films
American LGBT-related films
Columbia Pictures films
Films about dysfunctional families
Films about marriage
Films about vacationing
Films directed by Gilbert Cates
Films scored by Johnny Mandel
Films set in Belgium
Films set in New York City
Films shot in Belgium
Films shot in London
Films shot in Massachusetts
Films shot in New York City
Films with screenplays by Stewart Stern
LGBT-related drama films
Midlife crisis films